John McCloy may refer to:

John McCloy (Medal of Honor) (1876–1945), American naval officer who was twice awarded the Medal of Honor
John J. McCloy (1895–1989), American public official